Tsarevich Ivan may refer to:
Ivan I of Moscow, son of Daniel of Moscow and his wife Maria
Tsarevich Ivan Simeonovich, son of Simeon of Moscow and Maria of Tver
Ivan II of Moscow, son of Ivan I of Moscow and his wife Helena
Tsarevich Ivan Ivanovich, Prince of Zvenigorod (1356 – October 1364), son of Ivan II of Moscow and Alexandra Vasilyevna Velyaminova
Tsarevich Ivan Dmitriyevich (died 1393), son of Dmitry Donskoy and Eudoxia of Moscow
Tsarevich Ivan Vasilievich (1396–1417), son of Vasily I of Moscow and Sophia of Lithuania
Ivan III of Russia, son of Vasily II of Moscow and Maria of Borovsk
Ivan the Young (1458–1490), son of Ivan III of Russia and Maria of Tver
Ivan the Terrible, son of Vasili III of Russia and Elena Glinskaya
Tsarevich Ivan Ivanovich of Russia, son of Ivan IV of Russia and Anastasia Romanovna
Tsarevich Ivan Dmitriyevich, son of False Dmitry of Russia and Marina Mniszech
Tsarevich Ivan Mikhailovich, son of Michael of Russia and Eudoxia Streshneva
Ivan V of Russia, son of Alexis of Russia and Maria Miloslavskaya
Ivan Tsarevich, supposed youngest son of Tsar Vislav and Vasilisa Prekrasna